Daniel Logan, better known by his stage name Dallas DuBois, is an American actor and drag queen.

Early life
Daniel Logan was born in Long Island, New York, on June 9, 1986.

Career
Logan first started doing drag in 2008. He had previously used the drag name "Madonna Manson."

DuBois was featured in the web series Queens of Drag: NYC by gay.com in 2010. The series featured fellow New York drag queens Bianca Del Rio, Hedda Lettuce, Lady Bunny, Mimi Imfurst, Peppermint, Acid Betty, Epiphany Get Paid and Sherry Vine.

He is the founder of the theatre group Pure Imagination and the nonprofit charity Broadway to Benefit. Both groups educate about HIV/AIDS. Logan is HIV-positive.

In 2013, DuBois competed in the Miss'd America pageant, placing second runner-up. Victoria "Porkchop" Parker was the winner. He had previously competed in the pageant in 2011.

Filmography

Film

Television

Web series

Music video appearances

Theatre

See also
 LGBT culture in New York City
 List of LGBT people from New York City

References

External links
 

American drag queens
American gay actors
Living people
Nightlife in New York City
People from Long Island
People with HIV/AIDS
1986 births
21st-century LGBT people